Conrado Rolando (born 9 August 1904, date of death unknown) was a Uruguayan fencer. He competed in the individual and team épée and sabre events at the 1924 Summer Olympics.

References

External links
 

1904 births
Year of death missing
Sportspeople from Montevideo
Uruguayan male épée fencers
Olympic fencers of Uruguay
Fencers at the 1924 Summer Olympics
Uruguayan male foil fencers
20th-century Uruguayan people